William Cameron (September 25, 1847 – December 11, 1920) was an educator, farmer and political figure in Nova Scotia, Canada. He represented Pictou County in the Nova Scotia House of Assembly from 1887 to 1897 as a Conservative member.

He was born in Sutherland's River, Pictou County, Nova Scotia, a descendant of Scottish immigrants, and was educated at Dalhousie College. In 1882, he married Mary Catherine Dawson. Cameron taught school and was also a high school principal. He was first elected to the provincial assembly in an 1887 by-election held after Adam Carr Bell resigned his seat to run unsuccessfully for a federal seat.

William Cameron died in 1920. At the time of his death he was serving as county clerk of Pictou County.

References 

The Canadian parliamentary companion, 1891 JA Gemmill

1847 births
1920 deaths
Progressive Conservative Association of Nova Scotia MLAs